The SCW Tag Team Championship was a professional wrestling tag team championship in Southern Championship Wrestling (SCW). It remained active until November 20, 2004 when SCW was closed.

The inaugural champions were The Rat Pack (Jimmy Cicero and Brian Perry), who defeated The Andersons (Pat Anderson and C. W. Anderson) in a tournament final on November 17, 1994 to become the first SCW Tag Team Champions. At 484 days, Sex, Love, and Money's first reign was the longest, while the team's third and final reign, won at SCW's last show, was the shortest, lasting less than one day. With three reigns, Sex, Love, and Money also held the most reigns as a tag team and individually. Overall, there were 29 reigns.

Title history
Key

Names

Reigns

List of combined reigns

Footnotes

References
General

Specific

External links
SCWprowrestling.com

Tag team wrestling championships